Marshall Maquel McFadden (born August 4, 1986) is a former gridiron football linebacker who last played for the Toronto Argonauts of the Canadian Football League (CFL). He was signed  by the Pittsburgh Steelers to a reserve/future contract on January 18, 2012. He played college football at South Carolina State University.

College career
He played linebacker at South Carolina State. He finished the 2007 season with 12 tackles. He finished the 2008 season with 88 tackles, 5 sacks. He earned MEAC Defensive Player of the Week honors during the 2008 season.

Professional career

Pittsburgh Steelers
On January 18, 2012, he signed with the Pittsburgh Steelers to a reserve/future contract. On August 31, 2012, he was released on the day of roster cuts. On September 1, 2012, he was signed to the practice squad. On November 15, 2012, he was promoted from the practice squad after the team placed linebacker Chris Carter on injured reserve. On November 20, 2012, he was released from the Steelers after they signed wide receiver Plaxico Burress and quarterback Brian Hoyer. On November 21, he was signed to the practice squad.

Oakland Raiders
On September 2, 2013, he signed with the Oakland Raiders to a practice squad.

St. Louis Rams
On October 21, 2014, he was moved up to the St. Louis Rams' active roster. On September 5, 2015, he was released by the Rams.

NASCAR
After retiring from pro football, McFadden is currently a pit crew member for various NASCAR teams, currently working as a gasman for Jeremy Clements Racing.

References

External links
Oakland Raiders bio
Pittsburgh Steelers bio
South Carolina State Bulldogs bio

1986 births
Living people
People from Lamar, South Carolina
Players of American football from South Carolina
American football linebackers
Canadian football linebackers
African-American players of American football
African-American players of Canadian football
South Carolina State Bulldogs football players
Pittsburgh Steelers players
Oakland Raiders players
St. Louis Rams players
Toronto Argonauts players
NASCAR people
21st-century African-American sportspeople
20th-century African-American people